Moral superiority is the belief or attitude that one's position and actions are justified by having higher moral values than others.

It can refer to:
 Morality, when two systems of morality are compared
 Moral high ground
 Self-righteousness, when proclamations and posturing of moral superiority become a negative personal trait
 Superiority complex, when the moral superiority is a psychological reaction to insecurity and self-doubt

See also
 Moral absolutism
 Moral equivalence
 Moral relativism
 Moral universalism